Mjølfjell is a village area located in the eastern part of the Raundalen valley in the municipality of Voss in Vestland county, Norway.  Mjølfjell is served by the train station on the Bergen Line, Mjølfjell Station, both local trains from Voss and (less frequently) the Bergen to Oslo express trains make regular stops there. Mjølfjell has a grocery store, a chapel, and a military training facility. There are about 500 cabins in the area that are used for vacationers.

Media gallery

References

Villages in Vestland
Voss